Phryxus may refer to:
 an alternative spelling for Phrixus, the son of Athamas, king of Boiotia, and Nephele in Greek mythology
 Phryxus (isopod), an isopod genus in the family Bopyridae
 Phryxus (moth), a moths genus in the family Sphingidae

Genus disambiguation pages